Masaki Ogata (小県 真樹, born 1964) is a professional 9 dan Japanese Go player. He became an insei at the Nihon Ki-in in 1976 under Tsuchida Masamitsu, and turned professional in 1980. Ogata won the Kido magazine Shinjin (English: "New player") award with 38 wins and 8 losses in 1983, and the Kido award for most wins in 1988 with a record of 39 wins, 1 draw and 13 losses. He is currently affiliated with the Nagoya branch of the Nihon Ki-in.

Titles & runners-up

Notes

1964 births
Japanese Go players
Living people
Sportspeople from Gifu Prefecture